Many Nemesia cultivars have been developed for ornamental horticulture.

References

Lists of cultivars